The Zhongxing Terralord is a mid-size pickup truck designed and developed by Hebei Zhongxing Automobile.

Overview
Zhongxing revealed the Terralord during the 2016 Chengdu Auto Show, and launched the Terralord in the Chinese market in October 2016 with prices of the Terralord starting at 109,800 yuan and ending at 161,800 yuan ($16,200 – 24,000). As of 2019, prices of the Terralord were adjusted to 83,800 yuan to 198,800 yuan.

The Terralord features a standard four door crew cab short bed with the length measured at 1530mm, width at 1620mm, and a height of 515mm. Power wise, the Terralord was powered by an Isuzu sourced 2.5 liter turbo diesel engine producing 136 hp and 240 nm of torque. The transmission of the Terralord is a six-speed manual gearbox, sending power to all four wheels of the Terralord.

Zhongxing Weishi 1986
A facelift variant called the Weishi （威师） G7 Shooting Brake was launched in October 2021 powered by a 2.0-litre turbo diesel engine producing a maximum output of 166hp and 410N·m mated to a 6-speed manual transmission. The model was offered in 2 wheel drive and 4 wheel drive versions and available in 12 different trim levels. Despite the Shooting Brake name, the model is identical to the regular post-facelift Terralord and has exact same dimensions with an addition of decals on the side. The same model was revised in March 2022 and renamed to Weishi 1986 with additional trim levels added ending with a 20 trim level lineup.

Imperium Terra-E
The DSG Global Inc.(DSGT), and subsidiary automobile division Imperium Motor Corp collaborated with Zhejiang Jonway Group Co., Ltd. (Jonway Group) for the North American market and produced an electric version of the Terralord pickup called the Terra-E under the Imperium brand. The Imperium Terra-E has an estimated range of up to 225 miles according to the official website.

References

External links

Zhongxing Terralord Details
Dodge Charger Trim Levels

Pickup trucks
All-wheel-drive vehicles
Four-wheel drive layout
2010s cars
Cars introduced in 2016
Trucks of China
Cars of China